The  were two battleships of the Imperial Japanese Navy (IJN),    and ,  laid down leading up to World War II and completed as designed. A third hull laid down in 1940 was converted to an aircraft carrier, during construction.

Due to the threat of U.S. submarines and aircraft carriers, both Yamato and Musashi spent the majority of their careers in naval bases at Brunei, Truk, and Kure—deploying on several occasions in response to U.S. raids on Japanese bases.

All three ships were sunk by the U.S. Navy;  Musashi while participating in the Battle of Leyte Gulf in October 1944, the Shinano while under way from Yokosuka to Kure for fitting out in November 1944, and the Yamato while en route from Japan to Okinawa as part of Operation Ten-Go in April 1945.

Background
The design of the Yamato-class battleships was shaped by expansionist movements within the Japanese government, Japanese industrial power, and the need for a fleet powerful enough to intimidate likely adversaries. Most importantly, the latter, in the form of the Kantai Kessen (“Decisive Battle Doctrine”), a naval strategy adopted by the Imperial Japanese Navy prior to the Second World War, in which the Japanese navy would win a war by fighting and winning a single, decisive naval action.

After the end of the First World War, many navies—including those of the United States, the United Kingdom, and Imperial Japan—continued and expanded construction programs that had begun during the conflict. The enormous costs associated with these programs pressured their government leaders to begin a disarmament conference. On 8 July 1921, the United States' Secretary of State Charles Evans Hughes invited delegations from the other major maritime powers—France, Italy, Japan, and the United Kingdom—to come to Washington, D.C. and discuss a possible end to the naval arms race. The subsequent Washington Naval Conference resulted in the Washington Naval Treaty. It also agreed that the five countries would not construct more capital ships for ten years and would not replace any ship that survived the treaty until it was at least twenty years old.

In the 1930s, the Japanese government began a shift towards ultranationalist militancy.  This movement called for the expansion of the Japanese Empire to include much of the Pacific Ocean and Southeast Asia. The maintenance of such an empire—spanning  from China to Midway Island—required a sizable fleet capable of sustained control of territory. Although all of Japan's battleships built prior to the Yamato class had been completed before 1921—as the Washington Treaty had prevented any more from being completed—all had been either reconstructed or significantly modernized, or both, in the 1930s. This modernization included, among other things, additional speed and firepower, which the Japanese intended to use to conquer and defend their aspired-to empire.  When Japan withdrew from the League of Nations in 1934 over the Mukden Incident, it also renounced all treaty obligations, freeing it to build warships larger than those of the other major maritime powers.

Japan's intention to acquire resource-producing colonies in the Pacific and Southeast Asia would likely lead to confrontation with the United States, thus the U.S. became Japan's primary potential enemy. The U.S. possessed significantly greater industrial power than Japan, with 32.2% of worldwide industrial production compared to Japan's 3.5%. Furthermore, several leading members of the United States Congress had pledged "to outbuild Japan three to one in a naval race." Consequently, as Japanese industrial output could not compete with American industrial power, Japanese ship designers developed plans for new battleships individually superior to their counterparts in the United States Navy.  Each of these battleships would be capable of engaging multiple enemy capital ships simultaneously, eliminating the need to expend as much industrial effort as the U.S. on battleship construction.

Design

Preliminary studies for a new class of battleships began after Japan's departure from the League of Nations and its renunciation of the Washington and London naval treaties; from 1934 to 1936, 24 initial designs were put forth. These early plans varied greatly in armament, propulsion, endurance, and armor. Propulsion in most of the designs was a hybrid diesel-turbine combination, though one relied solely on diesel and another planned for only turbines. Armor varied between providing protection from the fire of 406 mm guns to enough protection against 460 mm guns.

After these had been reviewed, two of the original twenty-four were finalized as possibilities, A-140-F3 and A-140-F4. Differing primarily in their range ( versus  at ), they were used in the formation of the final preliminary study, which was finished on 20 July 1936. Tweaks to that design resulted in the definitive design of March 1937, which was put forth by Rear-Admiral Fukuda Keiji; a range of 7,200 nmi was finally decided upon, and the hybrid diesel-turbine propulsion was abandoned in favor of turbines. The diesel engines were removed from the design because of problems with the engines aboard the submarine tender Taigei. Their engines, which were similar to the ones that were going to be mounted in the new battleships, required a "major repair and maintenance effort" to keep them running due to a "fundamental design defect". In addition, if the engines failed entirely, the  armored citadel deck roof that protected the proposed diesel engine rooms and attendant machinery spaces, would severely hamper any attempt to remove and replace them.

The design called for a main armament of nine 460 mm naval guns, mounted in three three-gun turrets—each of which weighed more than a 1930s-era destroyer. The designs were quickly approved by the Japanese Naval high command, over the objections of naval aviators, who argued for the construction of aircraft carriers rather than battleships. In all, five Yamato-class battleships were planned.

Ships

Although five Yamato-class vessels had been planned in 1937, only three—two battleships and a converted aircraft carrier—were completed. All three vessels were built in extreme secrecy, to prevent American intelligence officials from learning of their existence and specifications; indeed, the United States' Office of Naval Intelligence only became aware of Yamato and Musashi by name in late 1942. In addition, the main armament of Yamato class was given as nine  guns as late as July 1945, four months after Yamato was sunk. Both Jane's Fighting Ships and the Western media also misreported the specifications of the ships. In September 1944, Jane's Fighting Ships listed the displacement of both Yamato and Musashi as 45,000 tons. Similarly, both the New York Times and the Associated Press reported that the two ships displaced 45,000 tons with a speed of 30 knots, and even after the sinking of Yamato in April 1945, The Times of London continued to give 45,000 tons as the ship's displacement. Nevertheless, the existence of the ships—and their supposed violation of naval treaties—heavily influenced American naval engineers in the design of the 60,500-ton s, though they were not designed specifically to counter the Yamato class.

Yamato

 was ordered in March 1937, laid down 4 November 1937, launched 8 August 1940, and commissioned 16 December 1941. She underwent training exercises until 27 May 1942, when the vessel was deemed "operable" by Admiral Isoroku Yamamoto. Joining the 1st Battleship Division, Yamato served as the flagship of the Japanese Combined Fleet during the Battle of Midway in June 1942, yet did not engage enemy forces during the battle. The next two years were spent intermittently between Truk and Kure naval bases, with her sister ship Musashi replacing Yamato as the flagship of the Combined Fleet. During this time period, Yamato, as part of the 1st Battleship Division, deployed on multiple occasions to counteract American carrier-raids on Japanese island bases.

In 1944—following extensive anti-aircraft and secondary battery upgrades—Yamato joined the Second Fleet in the Battle of the Philippine Sea, serving as an escort to a Japanese Carrier Division. Lightly damaged at Kure in March 1945, the ship was then rearmed in preparation for operations. Yamato was deliberately expended in a suicide mission as part of Operation Ten-Go, 
sent to use her big guns to provide relief to Japanese forces engaged in the Battle of Okinawa. She never came close, sunk en-route on  7 April 1945 by 386 American carrier aircraft.  After receiving 10 torpedo and 7 bomb hits she capsized, taking 2,498 of the 2,700 crew-members with her, including Vice-Admiral Seiichi Itō. The sinking of Yamato was seen as a major American victory, and Hanson W. Baldwin, the military editor of The New York Times, wrote that "the sinking of the new Japanese battleship Yamato ... is striking proof—if any were needed—of the fatal weakness of Japan in the air and at sea".

Musashi 

 was ordered in March 1937, laid down 29 March 1938, launched 1 November 1940, and commissioned 5 August 1942. From September to December 1942, she was involved in surface and air-combat training exercises at Hashirajima. On 11 February 1943, Musashi relieved her sister ship Yamato as the flagship of the Combined Fleet. Until July 1944, Musashi shifted between the naval bases of Truk, Yokosuka, Brunei, and Kure. On 29 March 1944, she sustained moderate damage near the bow from one torpedo fired by the American submarine . After repairs and refitting throughout April 1944, Musashi joined the 1st Battleship Division in Okinawa.

In June 1944, as part of the Second Fleet, the ship escorted Japanese aircraft carriers during the Battle of the Philippine Sea.  In October 1944, she left Brunei as part of Admiral Takeo Kurita's Center Force during the Battle of Leyte Gulf. Musashi was sunk 24 October during the Battle of the Sibuyan Sea, taking 17 bomb and 19 torpedo hits, with the loss of 1,023 of her 2,399-man crew.

Shinano 

Shinano, originally Warship Number 110, was laid down as the third member of the Yamato class, albeit with a slightly modified design. Most of the original armor values were slightly reduced, including the belt, deck, and turrets. The savings in weight this entailed meant that improvements could be made in other areas, including added protection for fire-control and lookout positions. In addition, the  secondary armament on the first two Yamatos was to have been replaced by the /65 caliber Type 98 gun. Although smaller, this gun was superior to the 127 mm, possessing a significantly greater muzzle velocity, maximum range, anti-aircraft ceiling, and rate of fire.

In June 1942, following the Japanese defeat at Midway, construction of Shinano was suspended, and the hull was gradually rebuilt as an aircraft carrier. She was designed as a 64,800-ton support vessel that would be capable of ferrying, repairing and replenishing the air fleets of other carriers. Although she was originally scheduled for commissioning in early 1945, the construction of the ship was accelerated after the Battle of the Philippine Sea; this resulted in Shinano being launched on 5 October 1944 and commissioned a little more than a month later on 19 November. Shinano departed Yokosuka for Kure nine days later. Although the damage seemed manageable, poor flooding control caused the vessel to list to starboard. Shortly before midday, she capsized and sank, taking 1,435 of her 2,400-man crew with her. To this day, Shinano is the largest naval vessel to have been sunk by a submarine.

Warships Number 111 and 797 
Warship Number 111, never named, was planned as the fourth member of the Yamato class and the second ship to incorporate the improvements of Shinano. The ship's keel was laid after Yamatos launch in August 1940 and construction continued until December 1941, when the Japanese began to question their ambitious capital ship building program—with the coming of war, the resources essential in constructing the ship would become much harder to obtain.

The fifth vessel, Warship Number 797, was planned as an improved Shinano but was never laid down. In addition to the modifications made to that ship, 797 would have removed the two  wing turrets in favor of additional 100 mm guns; authors William Garzke and Robert Dulin estimate that this would have allowed for 24 of these weapons. Yamato was eventually modified in 1944 to something akin to this.

Specifications

Armaments

Primary armament 

The Yamato-class battleships had primary armaments consisting of three 3-gun turrets mounting /45 caliber Type 94 naval guns – the largest guns ever fitted to a warship, although they were officially designated as the 40 cm/45 caliber (15.9 in) Type 94 – each of which weighed 2,774 tonnes for the complete mount.

The main guns were also capable of firing  3 Shiki tsûjôdan ("Common Type 3") anti-aircraft shells. Upon detonation, each of these shells would release 900 incendiary-filled tubes in a 20° cone facing towards incoming aircraft; a bursting charge was then used to explode the shell itself to create more steel splinters, finally, the tubes would ignite. Even though they comprised 40% of the total main ammunition load by 1944, 3 Shiki tsûjôdan were rarely used in combat against enemy aircraft due to the severe damage the firing of these shells inflicted on the barrels of the main guns; indeed, one of the shells may have exploded early and disabled one of Musashis guns during the Battle of the Sibuyan Sea. The shells were intended to put up a barrage of flame that any aircraft attempting to attack would have to navigate through. However, U.S. pilots considered these shells to be more of a pyrotechnics display than a competent anti-aircraft weapon.

Secondary armament 

In the original design, the Yamato class' secondary armament comprised twelve 15.5 cm/60 Type 3 guns mounted in four 3-gun turrets (one forward, two amidships, one aft), and twelve 12.7 cm/40 Type 89 guns in six double turrets (three on each side amidships). These had become available once the Mogami-class cruisers were rearmed with  guns. Their rate of fire was five rounds per minute. The two midships turrets were removed in 1944 in favor of additional  heavy and  light anti-aircraft guns.

Initially, heavy anti-aircraft defence was provided by a dozen 40-caliber 127-mm Type 89 dual-purpose guns in six double turrets, three on each side of the superstructure. In 1944, the two amidship 15.5 cm turrets were removed to make room for three additional 127-mm mounts on each side of Yamato, bringing the total number of these guns to twenty-four . Their maximum rate of fire was 14 rounds a minute; their sustained rate of fire was around eight rounds per minute.

Anti-aircraft armament 
The Yamato class originally carried twenty-four 25 mm Type 96 anti-aircraft guns, primarily mounted amidships. In 1944, both Yamato and Musashi underwent significant anti-aircraft upgrades in preparation for operations in Leyte Gulf using the space freed up by the removal of both midships  secondary battery turrets, and ended up with a complement of twenty-four  guns, and one hundred and sixty-two  antiaircraft guns, The 25 mm anti-aircraft guns could tilt at 90-degree angles to aim at planes directly overhead, but their mountings' lack of protection made their gunnery crews extremely vulnerable to direct enemy fire. The maximum effective rate of fire was only between 110 and 120 rounds per minute because of the frequent need to change the fifteen-round magazines. This was the standard Japanese light AA gun during World War II; it suffered from severe design shortcomings that rendered it a largely ineffective weapon. According to historian Mark Stille, the twin and triple mounts "lacked sufficient speed in train or elevation; the gun sights were unable to handle fast targets; the gun exhibited excessive vibration; the magazine was too small, and ... the gun produced excessive muzzle blast".

The class was also provided with two twin mounts for the licence-built 13.2 mm Type 93 anti-aircraft machine guns, one on each side of the bridge. The cyclic rate was adjustable between 425 and 475 rounds per minute; the need to change 30-round magazines reduced the effective rate to 250 rounds per minute.

The armament on Shinano was quite different from that of her sister vessels due to her conversion. As the carrier was designed for a support role, significant anti-aircraft weaponry was installed on the vessel: sixteen  guns, one hundred forty-five  anti-aircraft guns, and three hundred and thirty-six  anti-aircraft rocket launchers in twelve twenty-eight barrel turrets. None of these guns were ever used against an enemy vessel or aircraft.

Armor 

Designed to engage multiple enemy battleships simultaneously, the Yamatos were fitted with heavy armor plating described by naval historian Mark Stille as providing "an unparalleled degree of protection in surface combat". Furthermore, the top hull shape was very advanced, the peculiar sideways curving effectively maximizing armor protection and structural rigidity while optimizing weight. Armor plates in both the main belt and main turrets were made of Vickers Hardened steel, which was a face-hardened steel armor. Main armored deck— thick—was composed of a nickel-chromium-molybdenum alloy. Ballistics tests at the proving ground at Kamegakubi demonstrated the deck alloy to be superior to the homogeneous Vickers plates by 10–15%. Additional plating was designed by manipulating the chromium and nickel composition of the alloy. Higher contents of nickel allowed the plate to be rolled and bent without developing fracture properties.

No torpedo defense system compartments were liquid loaded, despite the known benefits. This may have been the result of overestimating the effectiveness of the lower belt armor against torpedoes, an effort to decrease draft, and provision of additional counter-flooding spaces.

The relatively new procedure of arc welding was used extensively throughout the ship, strengthening the durability of the armor plating. Through this technique, the lower-side belt armor was used to strengthen the hull structure of the entire vessel.  In total, the vessels of the Yamato class contained 1,147 watertight compartments, of which 1,065 were beneath the armored deck. The ships were also designed with a very large amount of reserve buoyancy to mitigate the effects of flooding.

However, despite the immense armor thickness, the protection scheme of the Yamato class still suffered from several major design flaws and shortcomings. Structural weakness existed near the bow of the vessels, where the armor plating was generally thinner, as demonstrated by Musashi's damage from a torpedo hit in 1943. The hull of the Shinano was subject to even greater structural weakness, being hastily constructed near the end of the war and having been equipped with incomplete armor and unsealed watertight compartments at the time of her sinking. The torpedo defense system performed substantially worse than designed. In particular, very poor jointing between the upper-belt and lower-belt armor created a rupture-prone seam just below the waterline. When combined with the relatively shallow system depth and the lack of liquid loading, this caused the class to be susceptible to torpedoes. Joint failures have been attributed to the considerable damage inflicted upon Yamato from a single torpedo impact in 1943, and to the sinking of Shinano from four hits in 1944.

Propulsion 
The Yamato class was fitted with 12 Kampon boilers, which powered quadruple steam turbines, with an indicated horsepower of 147,948. These, in turn, drove four  propellers. With this speed, the Yamato class' ability to function alongside fast carriers was limited. In addition, the fuel consumption rate of both battleships was very high. As a result, neither battleship was used in combat during the Solomon Islands Campaign or the minor battles during the "island hopping" period of 1943 and early 1944.

"Super Yamato"-class battleships 

Two battleships of an entirely new and larger design were planned as a part of the 1942 fleet replenishment program. Designated as Design A-150 and initially named Warship Number 178 and Warship Number 179, plans for the ships began soon after the design of the Yamato class was finished, probably in 1938–39. Everything was "essentially completed" sometime in 1941, but with war on the horizon, work on the battleships was halted to fill a need for additional warships, such as aircraft carriers and cruisers, to replace war losses of those vital ships. The Japanese loss in the Battle of Midway, where four carriers were sunk (out of ten, to date, in the entire navy), made it certain that work on the ships would never begin. In the third volume of their Battleships series, Axis and Neutral Battleships in World War II, the authors William H. Garzke and Robert O. Dulin asserted that these ships would have been the "most powerful battleships in history" because of their massive  main battery and extensive anti-aircraft weaponry.

Similar to the fate of papers relating to the Yamato class, most papers and all plans relating to the class were destroyed to prevent capture at the end of the war. It is known that the final design of the ships would have had an even greater firepower and size than the Yamato class—a main battery of six  guns in three turrets and secondary dual purpose armament consisting of twenty-four  dual mounted guns (similar to the s).

Destruction of records
On the eve of the Allies' occupation of Japan, special-service officers of the Imperial Japanese Navy destroyed virtually all records, drawings, and photographs of or relating to the Yamato-class battleships, leaving only fragmentary records of the design characteristics and other technical matters. The destruction of these documents was so efficient that until 1948 the only known images of Yamato and Musashi were those taken by United States Navy aircraft involved in the attacks on the two battleships. Although some additional photographs and information, from documents that were not destroyed, have come to light over the years, the loss of the majority of written records for the class has made extensive research into the Yamato class somewhat difficult. Because of the lack of written records, information on the class largely came from interviews of Japanese officers following Japan's surrender.

However, in October 1942, based upon a special request from Adolf Hitler, German Admiral Paul Wenneker, attached to the German Naval Attache in Japan, was allowed to inspect a Yamato-class battleship while it was undergoing maintenance in a dockyard, at which time Admiral Wenneker cabled a detailed description of the warship to Berlin. On 22 August 1943, Erich Groner, a German naval historian, and author of the book Die Deutschen Kriegschiffe, 1815–1945, was shown the report while at the "Führer Headquarters", and was directed to make an "interpretation" and then prepare a "design sketch drawing" of the Japanese battleship. The material was preserved by Erich Groner's wife, Mrs. H. Groner, and submitted to publishers in the 1950s.

Cultural significance 

From the time of their construction until the present day, Yamato and Musashi have carried a notable presence in Japanese culture, Yamato in particular. Upon completion, the battleships represented the epitome of Imperial Japanese naval engineering. In addition, the two ships, due to their size, speed, and power, visibly embodied Japan's determination and readiness to defend its interests against the western powers, especially the United States. Shigeru Fukudome, chief of the Operations Section of the Imperial Japanese Navy General Staff, described the two ships as "symbols of naval power that provided to officers and men alike a profound sense of confidence in their navy."

Yamato, and especially the story of her sinking, has appeared often in Japanese popular culture, such as the anime Space Battleship Yamato and the 2005 film Yamato.  The appearances in popular culture usually portray the ship's last mission as a brave, selfless, but futile, symbolic effort by the participating Japanese sailors to defend their homeland. One of the reasons that the warship may have such significance in Japanese culture is that the word "Yamato" was often used as a poetic name for Japan. Thus, the end of the battleship Yamato could serve as a metaphor for the end of the Japanese empire.

See also 

 H-class battleship proposals (World War II German Kriegsmarine)
  (U. S. Navy)
 Yamato Museum
  Purpose-built ship to carry main gun turrets and barrels of the class

Notes

Footnotes

References

Further reading

External links 

 Kure Yamato Museum

 

Battleship classes